The Hohenlohe is a Landkreis (district) in the north of Baden-Württemberg, Germany. Neighboring districts are (from north clockwise) Neckar-Odenwald, Main-Tauber, Schwäbisch Hall and Heilbronn.

Künzelsau is the administrative centre of the district.

Industry and companies

The Hohenlohekreis is host to many internationally active companies in the screws and ventilation industries.

 Würth 
 Stahl

History
The district was created in 1973 by merging the previous districts of Öhringen and Künzelsau. It was named after the Hohenlohe family, who had once ruled most of the area until 1806, when they lost their independence as this area became part of the Kingdom of Württemberg.

Geography
The two main rivers of the districts are the Kocher and Jagst, both tributaries of the Neckar.

Partnerships
Since 1990, the district has had a partnership with the County Limerick in the Republic of Ireland. In the same year, it also started a friendship with the district of Großenhain (now part of the district of Meissen) in Saxony, helping to build the administration according to West German standards.

Dialect
The dialect spoken locally is Hohenlohisch, an East Franconian dialect.

Coat of arms
The coat of arms in its top part shows two lions, which is the symbol of the family of Hohenlohe, who once had ruled most of the area. The Wheel of Mainz in bottom is the symbol of the clerical state of Mainz, which also had some possessions around Krautheim.

Cities and municipalities

References

External links

 Official website (German)
 Hohenlohe images (English and German)
 Map of Hohenlohe areas in the 1780s

 
Stuttgart (region)
Districts of Baden-Württemberg